Her Highness Maharani Sucharu Devi (or Suchara Devi) (9 October 1874 – 14 December 1959) was the Maharani of Mayurbhanj State, India.

Early life

She was born in a Bengali Hindu family. She was daughter of the Brahmo Samaj reformer Maharshi Keshub Chandra Sen of Calcutta. She married the Maharaja of Mayurbhanj State, Shri Sriram Chandra Bhanj Deo (1871–1912) in 1904, which was the Maharaja's second marriage after the death of his first wife. From her marriage with the Maharaja, she had one son and two daughters. Their only son, Maharaj Kumar Dhrubendra Bhanj Deo (1908–1945), was a Royal Air Force pilot, who died in action during World War II. She spent a major portion of her life in Mayurbhanj Palace, which was royal residence of rulers of Mayurbhanj State. Her husband, the Maharaja of Mayurbhanj built a mountain retreat in Shillong, where she spent her summer time and Rabindranath Tagore visited there as guest few times. The house is popular as Mayurbhanj palace which is a part of the North Eastern Hill University (NEHU) campus now. 

She and her sister, the Maharani of Koch Bihar, Suniti Devi, were noted for their elegant style of dressing.

Work

She and her sister Suniti Devi founded the Maharani Girls' High School at Darjeeling in 1908. Maharani Sucharu Devi was elected president of the Bengal Women's Education League in 1931. After the sudden death of his sister, Suniti Devi, in 1932, she was elected president of All Bengal Women's Union. In Calcutta she was known as a women's rights activist like her contemporaries Charulata Mukherjee, Saroj Nalini Dutt, T. R. Nelly, and her elder sister Suniti Devi the Maharani of Cooch Behar.

She died in 1959.

References

Indian female royalty
1874 births
1961 deaths
Bengali Hindus
Bengali activists
19th-century Bengalis
20th-century Bengalis
Queen mothers
History of Odisha
People from Kolkata
Indian women's rights activists
Indian activists
Indian women activists
Indian feminists
Brahmos
Founders of Indian schools and colleges
Indian women philanthropists
Indian philanthropists
Indian women educational theorists
19th-century Indian educational theorists
20th-century Indian educational theorists
Educators from West Bengal
People buried at Brahmo Cemetery, Nabodebalaya
19th-century Indian royalty
20th-century Indian royalty
Indian social workers
Social workers from West Bengal
Women educators from West Bengal
19th-century women educators
20th-century women educators
20th-century Indian women
20th-century Indian educators
19th-century Indian educators
Indian educators
Indian women educators
Educationists from India
Indian reformers
Indian social reformers